The World Junior Alpine Skiing Championships 2015 were the 34th World Junior Alpine Skiing Championships, held between 6–13 March 2015 in Hafjell, Norway.

Medal winners

Men's events

Women's events

Team event

External links
World Junior Alpine Skiing Championships 2015 results at fis-ski.com

World Junior Alpine Skiing Championships
2015 in alpine skiing
Alpine skiing competitions in Norway
2015 in Norwegian sport